Nicola S. H. Rogers  is a British archaeologist and small finds specialist. Following graduation from Southampton University in 1982 with a degree in Archaeology and History, she started her working career in Oxford, before moving to York in 1988 where she joined York Archaeological Trust as a Research Assistant. She worked for York Archaeological Trust as a small finds research specialist until 2015, when she set up as a freelancer, under the name Nicola Rogers Archaeology. Nicola was elected as a Fellow of the Society of Antiquaries of London on 12 March 2015. She has published numerous small finds reports, particularly relating to the archaeology of York. She is a committee member of CIFA Finds Group as part of the Chartered Institute for Archaeologists.

Select publications
Rogers, N. S. H. 1993. Anglian and Other Finds from Fishergate (Archaeology of York 17/9). York, York Archaeological Trust.
Mainman, A. J. and Rogers, N. S. H. 2000. Craft, Industry, and Everyday Life: Finds from Anglo-Scandinavian York (Archaeology of York 17/14). York, York Archaeological Trust.
Ottaway, P. and Rogers, N. 2002. Craft, Industry, and Everyday Life: Finds from Medieval York (Archaeology of York 17/15). York, York Archaeological Trust.
Kyriacou, C., Mee, F. and Rogers, N. S. H. 2004. Treasures of York. Ashbourne : Landmark
Rogers, N.S.H 2012. Medieval Craft and Mystery. York, York Archaeological Trust

References

External links
Nicola Roger's publications as listed on the Archaeology Data Service

British women archaeologists
British archaeologists
Fellows of the Society of Antiquaries of London
21st-century archaeologists
Year of birth missing (living people)
York Archaeological Trust
Living people